Akira Kono (11 September 1929 – 25 December 1995) was a Japanese gymnast who competed in the 1956 Summer Olympics.

References

1929 births
1995 deaths
Japanese male artistic gymnasts
Olympic gymnasts of Japan
Gymnasts at the 1956 Summer Olympics
Olympic silver medalists for Japan
Olympic medalists in gymnastics
Medalists at the 1956 Summer Olympics
20th-century Japanese people